Harald Stake (1598-1677) was a Swedish military commander.

In his early life, he was in military service in the Low Countries. After returning to Sweden, he served with distinction during the Swedish wars 1630-1648 as an officer in the cavalry. In the following years he served as military commander and governor in Bohuslän.

References

1598 births
1677 deaths